Saadullah Khan may refer to:

 Saadullah Khan (Mughal Empire), 17th-century Mughal prime minister
 Saadullah Khan of Rohilkhand, 18th-century Nawab of Rohilkhand
 Saadullah Khan (Pakistani footballer)